In Greek mythology, Glauce (Ancient Greek: Γλαυκή Glaukê means 'blue-gray' or 'gleaming'), Latin Glauca, refers to different people:

Glauce, an Arcadian nymph, one of the nurses of Zeus. She and the other nurses were represented on the altar of Athena Alea at Tegea.
Glauce, twin sister of Pluto who died as an infant according to Euhemerus.
Glauce, one of the Melian nymphs.
Glauce, one of the 50 Nereids, marine-nymph daughters of the 'Old Man of the Sea' Nereus and the Oceanid Doris. She personifies the color of the sea which can be attributed to her name that signifies "sea-green" or "bright green". Glauce and her other sisters appear to Thetis when she cries out in sympathy for the grief of Achilles at the slaying of his friend Patroclus.
Glauce, mother, by Upis, of "the third" Artemis in Cicero's rationalized genealogy of the Greek gods.
Glauce, a Libyan princess as one of the Danaïdes, daughters of  King Danaus. Her mother was either Atlanteia or Phoebe, both were hamadryads. Glauce married and murdered her cousin Alces, son of King Aegyptus of Egypt by an Arabian woman.
Glauce, a Corinthian princess as the daughter of King Creon. She married Jason. Creusa was killed, along with her father, by Medea, who either sent her a peplos steeped in flammable poison or set fire to the royal palace. In the local Corinthian tradition, Glauce threw herself into a well in a vain attempt to wash off Medea's poison; from this circumstance the well became known as the Well of Glauce. Also known by the name Creusa, predominantly in Latin authors, e.g. Seneca and Propertius. Hyginus uses both names interchangeably. In Cherubini's opera Medea she is known as Dircé.
Glauce, an Amazon. Some say that it was she, and not Antiope, who was abducted by Theseus and became his wife.
Glauce, a Salaminian princess as the daughter of King Cychreus, son of Poseidon and Salamis. Some sources say that Glauce married Actaeus and bore him a son Telamon. Others say that Telamon was her husband and that, after her death, he married Periboea, mother of Ajax.
Glauce, a princess of Colonae as daughter of King Cycnus, sister of Cobis and Corianus. During the Trojan campaign, she was taken captive by the Greeks and was given to Ajax, by whom she became mother of Aeantides.

Notes

References 

 Apollodorus, The Library with an English Translation by Sir James George Frazer, F.B.A., F.R.S. in 2 Volumes, Cambridge, MA, Harvard University Press; London, William Heinemann Ltd. 1921. ISBN 0-674-99135-4. Online version at the Perseus Digital Library. Greek text available from the same website.
 Dictys Cretensis, from The Trojan War. The Chronicles of Dictys of Crete and Dares the Phrygian translated by Richard McIlwaine Frazer, Jr. (1931-). Indiana University Press. 1966. Online version at the Topos Text Project.
 Diodorus Siculus, The Library of History translated by Charles Henry Oldfather. Twelve volumes. Loeb Classical Library. Cambridge, Massachusetts: Harvard University Press; London: William Heinemann, Ltd. 1989. Vol. 3. Books 4.59–8. Online version at Bill Thayer's Web Site
 Diodorus Siculus, Bibliotheca Historica. Vol 1-2. Immanel Bekker. Ludwig Dindorf. Friedrich Vogel. in aedibus B. G. Teubneri. Leipzig. 1888-1890. Greek text available at the Perseus Digital Library.
 Hesiod, Theogony from The Homeric Hymns and Homerica with an English Translation by Hugh G. Evelyn-White, Cambridge, MA.,Harvard University Press; London, William Heinemann Ltd. 1914. Online version at the Perseus Digital Library. Greek text available from the same website.
 Homer, The Iliad with an English Translation by A.T. Murray, Ph.D. in two volumes. Cambridge, MA., Harvard University Press; London, William Heinemann, Ltd. 1924. . Online version at the Perseus Digital Library.
 Homer, Homeri Opera in five volumes. Oxford, Oxford University Press. 1920. . Greek text available at the Perseus Digital Library.
 Gaius Julius Hyginus, Fabulae from The Myths of Hyginus translated and edited by Mary Grant. University of Kansas Publications in Humanistic Studies. Online version at the Topos Text Project.
 Lactantius, Divine Institutes translated by William Fletcher (1810-1900). From Ante-Nicene Fathers, Vol. 7. Edited by Alexander Roberts, James Donaldson, and A. Cleveland Coxe. Buffalo, NY: Christian Literature Publishing Co., 1886. Online version at the Topos Text Project.
 Lucius Annaeus Seneca, Tragedies. Translated by Miller, Frank Justus. Loeb Classical Library Volumes. Cambridge, MA, Harvard University Press; London, William Heinemann Ltd. 1917. Online version at theio.com.
 Lucius Annaeus Seneca, Tragoediae. Rudolf Peiper. Gustav Richter. Leipzig. Teubner. 1921. Latin text available at the Perseus Digital Library.
 Marcus Tullius Cicero, Nature of the Gods from the Treatises of M.T. Cicero translated by Charles Duke Yonge (1812-1891), Bohn edition of 1878. Online version at the Topos Text Project.
 Marcus Tullius Cicero, De Natura Deorum. O. Plasberg. Leipzig. Teubner. 1917.  Latin text available at the Perseus Digital Library.
 Pausanias, Description of Greece with an English Translation by W.H.S. Jones, Litt.D., and H.A. Ormerod, M.A., in 4 Volumes. Cambridge, MA, Harvard University Press; London, William Heinemann Ltd. 1918. . Online version at the Perseus Digital Library
 Pausanias, Graeciae Descriptio. 3 vols. Leipzig, Teubner. 1903.  Greek text available at the Perseus Digital Library.
 Sextus Propertius, Elegies from Charm. Vincent Katz. trans. Los Angeles. Sun & Moon Press. 1995. Online version at the Perseus Digital Library. Latin text available at the same website.

Nereids
Amazons (Greek mythology)
Danaids
Princesses in Greek mythology
Deities in the Iliad
Salaminian characters in Greek mythology